The Metropolitan, formerly known as Chase Tower (before 2015), and Lincoln First Bank (before 1996), is a skyscraper located in Rochester, New York, United States. It has 27 floors and was constructed in 1973. The architect responsible for designing the building was John Graham & Company. The building is unique for its outstanding white vertical fins and that it curves outward on the bottom. This building is also known for its fast elevators. Many people refer to them as "rockets". They were installed in the 1970s and travel at about 1000 feet per minute.

The Metropolitan was renovated in 1987 and again in 2015.

Recent renovations

The upper floors of the building were converted to apartments in 2016. 

A new entrance way was completed in 2017.

Damage to fins
The white fins were originally made with marble panel coverings. By the 1980s, however, these began to warp and loosen. They were replaced with painted aluminum panels.

Gallery

See also
List of tallest buildings in Rochester, New York
List of tallest buildings in Upstate New York

References

JPMorgan Chase buildings
Skyscraper office buildings in Rochester, New York
Office buildings completed in 1973
1973 establishments in New York (state)